Michel Pageaud (born 30 August 1966 in Luçon, Vendée) is a French former professional footballer who played as a goalkeeper for Angers SCO, Valenciennes and Scottish club Dundee.

Pageaud played for Dundee in the 1995 Scottish League Cup Final defeat by Aberdeen. He returned to France at the end of the 1995–96 season under the Bosman ruling.

References

External links
 
 

1966 births
Living people
People from Luçon
Sportspeople from Vendée
Association football goalkeepers
French footballers
Ligue 1 players
Ligue 2 players
Championnat National players
Scottish Football League players
Angers SCO players
Valenciennes FC players
Dundee F.C. players
French expatriate footballers
French expatriate sportspeople in Scotland
Expatriate footballers in Scotland
Footballers from Pays de la Loire